Nightjet (stylised as nightjet) is a brand name given by the Austrian Federal Railways ÖBB to its overnight passenger train services.

Nightjet operates in Austria, Belgium, France, Germany, Italy, the Netherlands, Poland and Switzerland. There are services provided by other train companies to Croatia, Hungary, Poland, Czech Republic, Slovakia and Slovenia that operate under the Nightjet Partner label. Nightjet trains offers beds in sleeper carriages (Nightjet's most comfortable service category), couchette carriages, and seated carriages. On certain connections, cars can also be transported on the train. Bikes can be transported in a bike transport bag, or on some connections also in special bike racks.

History
During December 2015, the German state railway company Deutsche Bahn announced that it would stop its night train services under the City Night Line branding and replace them with additional overnight high speed ICE services; this outcome followed years of efforts to turnaround the sector, which the company claimed to be little used, accounting for roughly 1% of all long distance passengers that year, and thus unprofitable. Even prior to this decision, discussions were underway with the Austrian Federal Railways ÖBB on the topic of continuing traditional night trains in some form. During February 2016, reports emerged that ÖBB was in negotiations with Deutsche Bahn to take over the operation of several night train services. Furthermore, the company was also evaluating its options in regards to rolling stock for operating these services, these included new-build carriages as well as the modernisation of existing rolling stock. Later that year, ÖBB decided to adopt the Nightjet branding for its night train service.

In December 2016, the first Nightjet services were launched; that same month, Deutsche Bahn discontinued its own competing night trains. During February 2017, ÖBB declared that passenger numbers on the Nightjet services were growing.

In August 2019, the Swiss Federal Railways (SBB) and ÖBB jointly announced their plans to expand the passenger services between their two countries; this included the running of Nightjet services between the Swiss cities of Zürich and Basel with the German urban centres of Berlin and Hamburg. Furthermore, the two companies were examining options for the further expansion of the Nightjet network and to provide more overnight connections to Switzerland. That same year, Netherlands Railways (NS) was also discussing options with ÖBB for the provision of night trains through to Amsterdam; in October 2019, it was announced that the Dutch government had agreed to provide a temporarily subsidy for NS and Nightjet to jointly provide daily night trains between Amsterdam, Nürnberg, Munich, Innsbruck, and Vienna.

Usage of the service steadily grew during the 2010s; in October 2019, ÖBB CEO Andreas Matthä stated the passenger traffic on the Nightjet had grown by 10 percent over the year prior. During the first half of 2020, along with the majority of cross-border services in Europe, Nightjet services were temporarily suspended on account of the COVID-19 pandemic; on June 2020, the resumption of regular scheduled operations was announced. In December 2020, four railway companies, including ÖBB, Deutsche Bahn, SBB, and France's SNCF, signed an agreement to cooperate on the development of night train services across Europe; specifically, the launch of four new Nightjet connections between 13 European cities will be prioritised. Two of these services will run between Vienna, Munich, and Paris, as well as Zurich, Cologne, and Amsterdam, starting in December 2021, while services between Vienna and Berlin, and Brussels and Paris, will commence during December 2023. In December 2024, a new service between Zurich and Barcelona will be launched as well.

In August 2018, ÖBB announced the placement of an initial €375m order for eight day trains and 13 night trains as part of a wider €1.5bn framework agreement with the German engineering company Siemens Mobility for a new fleet of long-distance trains, which includes the delivery of up to 700 passenger coaches over the next five years. The new Viaggio coaches, which will be manufactured at Siemens’ factory in Vienna, shall be operated with ÖBB’s existing fleet of Siemens Taurus locomotives, and be operated in Austria, Germany, Italy and Switzerland, while provisions are present to equip the coaches for use in Croatia, the Czech Republic, Hungary, Poland, Slovakia and Slovenia as well. The seven-car night trains offer 100 seats and 160 berths, and are fully equipped to accommodate passengers with limited mobility. Siemens claims that the Viaggio coaches have improved energy efficiency achieved through LED interior lighting, air conditioning via heat pumps in both cooling and heating modes, and a regulated fresh air supply based on the interior CO2 levels. Commissioning of the new fleet is expected in 2022, with service entry starting in the summer of 2023.

In October 2019, as a stopgap measure, ÖBB announced its intention to lease sleeping and couchette cars, permitting additional Nightjet services to be operated without having to wait for the delivery of its outstanding Siemens order. Specifically, two options were evaluated; the hiring of four sleeping and four couchette cars between 2020 and 2023 that can operate in Germany, Denmark and Sweden; or eight sleeping cars and eight couchette cars between 2021 and 2022 with approval for operation in Austria, Germany, Switzerland, Belgium and the Czech Republic. In August 2020, ÖBB received permission by the Austrian federal government to purchase an additional 20 seven-car Nightjet trains along with additional locomotives for a combined value of roughly €500m. When combined with previous orders, ÖBB’s new-build rolling stock for the Nightjet includes 231 new sleeping cars, couchettes, and seated vehicles; the expansion of the fleet will enable the operator to reach more destinations. That same month, as to accommodate the expanding fleet, ÖBB invested €40m into the modernisation and enlargement of the Vienna Simmering depot, which included the construction of a new 5,500m2 maintenance hall with two elevated tracks. In August 2021, a further 20 seven-car Nightjets, based on the new generation Viaggio Next Level, were ordered from Siemens Mobility.

Train services

References

External links

 Official website

Night trains
Rail transport in Europe
Passenger rail transport in Austria
Passenger rail transport in Germany
Passenger rail transport in Italy
Passenger rail transport in Switzerland
Railway services introduced in 2016